El hubiera sí existe (formerly known as Ni un minuto que perder), is a 2019 Mexican dramedy film directed by Luis Eduardo Reyes, with a screenplay by Adriana Pelusi. It stars Ana Serradilla, and Christopher von Uckermann as the main's characters. The film is scheduled to premiere on 25 December 2019.

The film finished filming in 2016, and has locations like Mexico City, and Mexico state.

Plot 
Elisa (Ana Serradilla) has become a shy, conservative girl, dedicated to her job and avoiding social life. Between her family and her job, the only person she lives with in her routine is Carlos, whom she could consider her best friend. One day Elisa is visited by her future self, who explains that the way to resume her life and find happiness is to lose her fear at work and let herself be found by love.

Cast 
 Ana Serradilla as Elisa
 Ofelia Medina as Adult Elisa
 Christopher von Uckermann as Carlos
 José Carlos Femat as Roberto
 Esmeralda Pimentel as Rosita
 Nico Galán as Diego
 Claudia Ramírez as Guadalupe
 Antonio de la Vega
 Cynthia Rodríguez
 Leonardo de Lozanne
 Jorge Gallegos
 Francisco de la Reguera

References

External links 
 

Mexican comedy-drama films
2010s Spanish-language films
2010s Mexican films